Bazneshin may refer to:
 Bazneshin-e Olya
 Bazneshin-e Sofla